Richard L. Clemmer (born c. 1952) is an American business executive. He was the chief executive officer of NXP Semiconductors from 2009 to 2020.

Career
Privafy- Named by CRN as One of The 10 Hottest Cybersecurity Startups Of 2020

In 2018, Clemmer was listed in the inaugural EDGE 50, naming the world's top 50 influencers in edge computing.

In 2016, Clemmer had the great honor to receive for NXP the first Stop Slavery Award in London.  https://blogs.thomsonreuters.com/answerson/announcing-winners-first-ever-stop-slavery-award/

References

Living people
1950s births
Texas Tech University alumni
Southern Methodist University alumni
American chief executives
NXP Semiconductors people